"V.I.P." is a song by German pop group Bro'Sis. It was written by Pete Kirtley, Tim Hawes, Q, and Darius Rustrum, with additional writing by band members Shaham Joyce and Faiz Mangat, for the band's second studio album Days of Our Lives (2003). Produced by Peter Ries, it was released as the album's second and final single.

Formats and track listings

Credits and personnel

 Ross Antony – vocals
 Hila Bronstein – vocals
 Nik Hafeman – vocal arrangement, recording, supervising producer
 Trevor Hurts – recording
 Shaham Joyce – vocals

 Faiz Mangat – vocals
 Peter Ries – production, vocal arrangement, recording, mixing
 Ossi Schaller – guitars
 Indira Weis – vocals
 Giovanni Zarrella – vocals

Charts

References

2003 songs
Bro'Sis songs
Polydor Records singles
Songs written by Pete Kirtley
Songs written by Tim Hawes